is a South Indian name. It has several spelling variants.

Variants

The following is a non-exhaustive list. Some spellings separate the name elements , e.g. .

Etymology and usage

Derived from the Hindu deity Krishna and the Sanskrit term murti (form), the name can be translated "in the form (or image) of Krishna". Usually a given name, it may also be a family name or westernized into a surname.

People
Non-Indian nationality is  when known.

A
 Anand Krishnamoorthi (b. 1990) film sound designer, editor, and mixer

B
 Bhadriraju Krishnamurti (19282012) Dravidian linguist
 Bhavani Narayanrao Krishnamurti Sharma or B. N. K. Sharma (19092005) writer and scholar

H
 H.M. Krishna Murthy former university researcher

J
 Jalakantapuram Ramaswamy Krishnamoorthy or J. R. Krishnamoorthy medical doctor
 Jana Krishnamurthy (19282007) politician
 Jiddu Krishnamurti (18951986) philosopher

K
 K. Krishnamurthy (19152011) writer, publisher and political activist
 Kambalapadu Ediga Krishnamurthy Goud or K. E. Krishnamurthy (b. 1938) politician
 Kalki Krishnamurthy (18991954) writer, journalist and Indian independence activist
 Karanam Balaram Krishna Murthy or Prakasam Zilla Tiger (b. 1946) politician
 Kavita Krishnamurthy (b. 1958) film playback singer
 Krishnasamy Krishnamoorthy or K. Krishnamoorthy (19442019) politician

L
 Lakshmi Krishnamurti (19252009) author and politician

M
 Malladi Venkata Krishna Murthy (b. 1949) writer
 Mukkamala Krishnamurthy or Mukkamala (19201987) actor and film director
 Muniandy Krishnamurthi or Krishnamurthi Muniandy (b. 1980) cricketer

N
 Nandalal Krishnamoorthy or Nandhu (b. 1965) actor
 Nedunuri Krishnamurthy (19272014) artist and art educator

P
 P. Krishnamoorthy (19432020) film artist, production and costume designer
 Panchapakesa Krishnamurti or P. Krishnamurti (19031966) scientist and industrialist
 Perumal Krishnamurthy or Krishnamurthy Perumal (b. 1943) athlete, field hockey player, coach and manager
 Pochiah Krishnamurthy (19471999) cricketer
 Puranik Krishnamoorthy or Krishnamoorthy Puranik (19111985) educator and writer
 Purniah Narasinga Rao Krishnamurti or P. N. Krishnamurti (18491911) lawyer and civil administrator

R
 Raja Krishnamoorthi (b. 1973) Illinois (US) businessman, lawyer, civil servant, and US Representative
 Rajagopalan Krishnamurthy or Krishnamurthy Rajagopalan (b. 1967) cricketer
 Rajannaidu Krishnamoorthy or Krishnamoorthy Rajannaidu politician

S
 S. Krishnamoorthy politician
 S. Krishnamoorthy or Madhan Bob (b. 1953) comedian and actor
 S. S. Krishnamoorthy or "Agri" S. S. Krishnamoorthy (b. 1959) politician
 S. V. Krishnamoorthy Rao (19021968) politician
 Santhanam Krishnamurthy or Krishnamurthy Santhanam (d. 2021) nuclear scientist
 Sripada Krishnamurty Sastry (18661960) Telugu-language poet
 Subramanian Krishnamoorthy (19292014) writer
 Suchitra Krishnamoorthi (b. 1975) actor, writer, painter and singer
 Sudhakar Krishnamurti (b. 1957) medical doctor

T
 Tammareddy Krishna Murthy (19202013) film producer
 Taruvai Subayya Krishnamurthy or T. S. Krishnamurthy (b. 1941) former Indian civil servant, including Chief Election Commissioner
 Thiru Krishnamoorthy or Thiru (b. 1979) film director and screenwriter
 Tiruvalam Natarajan Krishnamurti or T. N. Krishnamurti (19322018) meteorologist and academic

U
 Uppaluri Gopala Krishnamurti or U. G. Krishnamurti (19182007) philosopher

V
 V. Krishnamurthy Gounder politician
 Vaidyanathan Krishnamurthy or V. Krishnamurthy (19292002) veterinarian and conservationist
 Venkataraman Krishnamurthy or V. Krishnamurthy (19252022) Indian civil servant and government advisor
 Krishnamurti Villanueva or Cris Villanueva (b. 1971) Filipino film and television actor

Y
 Yamini Krishnamurthy (b. 1940) traditional and folk dancer

No other name
 Krishnamoorthy ( or 1964 ) comedic actor in Tamil cinema

Indian surnames
Indian given names